Webb Lake may refer to:

 Webb Lake (Maine), a lake
 Webb Lake, Wisconsin, a town
 Webb Lake (community), Wisconsin, an unincorporated community within the town